The klong thap is a goblet-shaped drum used for providing the changes of rhythm and also for supporting rhythm of the Nora (Southern dance drama). Its length is about 40-50 centimeters. The body is made from heartwood of a jackfruit tree that has been carved into a goblet shape. A single drumhead is a thin leather membrane made from langur skin or cat skin, which is attached to the body by cloth strings or rattan strings. The klong thap is almost always played in a pair, with one slightly lower in pitch called luk thoeng and one slightly higher in pitch called luk chap.

External links
Sound sample

See also
Traditional Thai musical instruments

Thai musical instruments
Goblet-shaped drums